The following is a list of mayors of the city of Rio Branco, in Acre state, Brazil.

 , 1900-1908 
 , 1908-1912 
 , 1912-1916 
 João de Deus Barreto, 1917-1920
 , 1920-1925 
 , 1925-1929	
 , 1929 
 , 1929-1936	
 , 1936-1945	
 , 1945-1950	
 , 1950-1953	
 , 1953-1957	
 , 1957-1961
 , 1961-1963
 Aníbal Miranda Ferreira da Silva, 1963-1964
 Raimundo Hermínio de Melo, 1964-1966, 1966-1968
 , 1966		
 Adauto Brito da Frota, 1969-1971, 1975-1977
 Durval Wanderley Dantas, 1971-1975
 Fernando Inácio dos Santos, 1977-1983
 , 1983-1985, 2001-2002 
 Adalberto Aragão, 1986-1988
 Jorge Kalume, 1989-1992
 Jorge Viana, 1993-1996
 , 1997-2000
 Isnard Leite, 2002-2004	
 , 2005-2012
 , 2013-2018 
 , 2018-

See also
 Elections in Rio Branco (in Portuguese)
 List of mayors of largest cities in Brazil (in Portuguese)
 List of mayors of capitals of Brazil (in Portuguese)

References

This article incorporates information from the Portuguese Wikipedia.

Rio Branco